The Javan blue flycatcher (Cyornis banyumas) is a species of bird in the family Muscicapidae.
It is endemic to the Indonesian islands of Java and Panaitan. The Dayak blue flycatcher (Cyornis montanus) of Borneo, which was formerly considered conspecific, was split as a distinct species by the IOC in 2021.

References

Javan blue flycatcher
Javan blue flycatcher
Taxa named by Thomas Horsfield
Endemic fauna of Java
Birds of Java